Henry M. Munro (May 17, 1840 – December 28, 1915) was a farmer and political figure in Nova Scotia, Canada. He represented Annapolis County in the Nova Scotia House of Assembly from 1882 to 1886 as a Liberal member.

He was born in Kings County, Nova Scotia and was self-educated. In 1868, he married Margaret Spinney. Munro was principal of a public school for five years. Munro died at Kingston Station in Annapolis County, Nova Scotia.

References 
The Canadian parliamentary companion, 1883 JA Gemmill
 A Directory of the Members of the Legislative Assembly of Nova Scotia, 1758-1958, Public Archives of Nova Scotia (1958)

1840 births
1915 deaths
Nova Scotia Liberal Party MLAs